Body & Society is a quarterly peer-reviewed academic journal that publishes scholarly research on the body. The journal was established in 1995 and is published by SAGE Publications on behalf of the TCS Centre, formerly based at Nottingham Trent University and  now operating primarily out of Goldmiths, University of London.

Abstracting and indexing 
Body & Society is abstracted and indexed in Scopus and the Social Sciences Citation Index. According to the Journal Citation Reports, its 2017 impact factor is 2.900, ranking it 10th out of 146 journals in the "Sociology" category.

References

External links
 

Anthropology journals
English-language journals
Nottingham Trent University
Publications established in 1995
Quarterly journals
SAGE Publishing academic journals